= Team Picnic–PostNL =

Team Picnic–PostNL may refer to:

- Team Picnic–PostNL (women's team)
- Team Picnic–PostNL (men's team)
